Michael Ohnesorge (born 29 September 1983) is a German former professional footballer who played as a defender.

Career

Germany
Ohnesorge was born in Wittenberg, Saxony-Anhalt, and began his career with youth clubs FP 08 Duisburg and Hamborn 07, before stepping up to the senior game with Adler Osterfeld in 2004. He then had one year spells with SG Wattenscheid 09, FC Schalke 04 II and SV Elversberg.

Scotland
In July 2008, Ohnesorge came to Scotland, to go on trial with Clyde. He joined the squad on their pre-season tour, and scored in a game against Norwich City. After impressing during his trial period, he signed a two-year contract. He made his Clyde debut in the first league game of the 2008–09 season in August 2008, in a 1–1 draw with Greenock Morton. He had his contract terminated by mutual consent in December 2008, after making 14 appearances in all competitions.

Return to Germany
After the end of his contract leaves Scotland and signed in January 2009 with TV Jahn Hiesfeld who was named as Captain in the Niederrheinliga.

References

External links
 
 

1983 births
Living people
People from Wittenberg
German footballers
Footballers from Saxony-Anhalt
Association football defenders
Scottish Football League players
SG Wattenscheid 09 players
SV Elversberg players
FC Schalke 04 II players
Clyde F.C. players
TV Jahn Hiesfeld players
German expatriate footballers
German expatriate sportspeople in Scotland
Expatriate footballers in Scotland